Ascalenia isotacta is a moth in the family Cosmopterigidae. It was described by Edward Meyrick in 1911. It is found on the Seychelles.

References

Moths described in 1911
Ascalenia
Moths of Africa